This article lists the heads of government of Norfolk Island.

(Dates in italics indicate de facto continuation of office, irrespective of continuation of status of that office)

See also
History of Norfolk Island
List of administrative heads of Norfolk Island

References

Norfolk Island heads of government
 Heads of government